Kubiak is a Polish surname. Notable people with the surname include:

 Clifford Kubiak (born 1953), American biochemist
 Dan Kubiak (1938–1998), Texas politician
 Gary Kubiak (born 1961), American football coach
 Jim Kubiak (born 1972), American football coach
 Klint Kubiak (born 1987), American football coach
Marcin Kubiak (born 1969), Polish diplomat
 Marcin Kubiak, Polish astrophysicist
 Michał Kubiak (born 1988), Polish volleyball player
 Ryszard Kubiak (born 1950), Polish rower
 Ted Kubiak (born 1942), American baseball player
 Teresa Kubiak (born 1937), Polish operatic soprano
 Zygmunt Kubiak (1929–2004), Polish writer

See also 
 Jakubiak, similar Polish surname

Polish-language surnames